Vain City Chronicles is the second album release by Norwegian gothic metal band The Crest.

The album was recorded in November 2004 at Top Room Studio and produced by Kristian Sigland. The album was released on May 17, 2005.

A videoclip was made for "Run Like Blazes" featuring the band performing in a 1930s club before lead singer Nell Sigland tries to flee with the cash. The other band members eventually catch and shoot her, leaving her to bleed to death on a street.

The Spanish lyrics on "Reptile" it is from a poem of Uruguayan poet Roberto Genta, but was recorded by a Spanish actor. Track #11 "My War / Broken Glass" features an acoustic reprise of track #2 "My War".

Track listing
"Run Like Blazes"
"My War"
"Silent"
"Another Life"
"Come on Down"
"Flavour of the Day"
"Reptile"
"New Profound Fear"
"Imaginary Friend"
"House of Mirrors"
"My War / Broken Glass"

Line up
 Nell Sigland - Vocals, keyboards
 Kristian Sigland - Guitars, vocals, keyboards, programming
 Magnus Westgaard - Bass, vocals
 Sebastian Aarebrot - Guitars
 Klaus Blomvik - Drums

References

2005 albums
The Crest (band) albums
Season of Mist albums